Dundee HSFP is a former rugby union team that played their home games at the Mayfield Playing Fields, Dundee, Scotland. The club disbanded in 2021.

The team was founded in 1880 by former pupils of the High School of Dundee. Please see Dundee Rugby Club for future club information.

History

Beginnings
No doubt inspired by Abertay's Louis Auldjo, Dundee's first international rugby player, who had represented Scotland against England at the Oval in 1878, Dundee High School Former Pupils' Rugby Football Club was formed in 1880 by a group of schoolfriends and rugby aficionados, David Hynd, David Hutchison and Tom Ferguson, the principals of the affectionately monikered "Maryfield Gang" after the scrap of wasteland on which they would play after school. With no sport on the school curriculum in the 19th century, the boys passionately followed local teams Abertay and Red Cross and upon leaving school met in The Victoria coffee house on 23 November 1880 and decided to form their own team.

That meeting produced the first office bearers of the club:

1st XV

 Captain: David M Hutchison
 Sub-Captain and Secretary: Thomas C Ferguson
 Treasurer: David Hynd
 Committee: Herbert Bell, James Martin, David Robertson

2nd XV

 Captain: Alexander Hynd
 Sub-Captain: G. Stevenson
 Secretary: William Ross

The club changed to be no longer restricted to former pupils of the high school and was an open club.

Purchase

The club bought Morgan Academy RFC to form a new club Dundee Rugby in 2021. One of the main reasons for the purchase was to rescue both clubs and then to pretend it was a development plan to get the new club into the professional Super 6 league.

Sevens

The club ran the Dundee Sevens tournament. On the club's merger with Morgan in 2021 to form Dundee Rugby a new Sevens tournament began that year to announce the merger. The first winners of the Dundee City Sevens were Blazin’ Squad (Men) and the Howe Harlequins (Women).

Honours

Men's

 Scottish National League Division One
 Champions (2): 2005–06, 2008–09
 Scottish National League Division Two
 Champions (2): 1989–90, 2002–03
 Orkney Sevens
 Champions (2): 2006, 2007
 Glasgow University Sevens
 Champions (1): 1996
 Glenrothes Sevens
 Champions (1): 1991
 Midlands District Sevens
 Champions (5): 1926, 1930, 1964, 1991, 1992
 Howe of Fife Sevens
 Champions (1): 1993
 Stirling Sevens
 Champions (1): 1970

Women's

 Mull Sevens
 Champions (1): 2012

Notable former players

Men's

Scotland national rugby union team

Stewart Campbell (17 caps)
Alasdair Dickinson (58 caps)
Iain Fullarton (6 caps)
Sean Lamont (105 caps)
David Leslie (31 caps, Rugby World's Player of the Year 1984, 5 Nations Grand Slam winner)
Shaun Longstaff (15 caps)
John Manson (1 cap)
Jon Petrie (45 caps)
George Ritchie (1 cap, first ever DHSFP player to be capped in 1932)
Richie Vernon (24 caps)

British and Irish Lions

Andy Nicol (23 Scotland caps, European Cup 1997/98, World XV v NZ 1993)
Chris Rea (13 Scotland caps)
Tom Smith (60 Scotland caps)
Rob Wainwright (34 Scotland caps)

Others

Frank Hadden – Former Scotland coach
Jason Hewett – New Zealand international
Jacob Rauluni – Fiji international
Moses Rauluni – Fiji international
Adam Russell – USA international

References

Sources

 Massie, Allan A Portrait of Scottish Rugby (Polygon, Edinburgh)

Rugby clubs established in 1880
Rugby union clubs disestablished in 2021
1880 establishments in Scotland
2021 disestablishments in Scotland
Rugby union in Dundee
Defunct Scottish rugby union clubs